Edith Madeleine Carroll (26 February 1906 – 2 October 1987) was an English actress, popular both in Britain and America in the 1930s and 1940s.  At the peak of her success in 1938, she was the world's highest-paid actress.

Carroll is remembered for her role in Alfred Hitchcock's The 39 Steps (1935). She is also noted for largely abandoning her acting career after the death of her sister Marguerite in the London Blitz to devote herself to helping wounded servicemen and children displaced or maimed by the war. She was awarded both the Legion d'Honneur and the Medal of Freedom for her work with the Red Cross.

Early life
Carroll was born at 32 Herbert Street (now number 44) in West Bromwich, Staffordshire, daughter of John Carroll, an Irish professor of languages from County Limerick, and Helene, his French wife. She graduated from the University of Birmingham, with a B.A. degree in languages. While at university she appeared in some productions for the Birmingham University Dramatic Society. She was a French mistress at a girls' school in Hove for a year.

Acting career

Early years
Carroll's father opposed her taking up acting, but with her mother’s support she quit teaching and traveled to London to look for stage work. She had won a beauty contest, and got a job in Seymour Hicks' touring company, making her stage debut in 1927 in The Lash. The following year she made her screen debut in The Guns of Loos, and then starred alongside Miles Mander in The First Born, written by Alma Reville. Thence she met Reville's husband, Alfred Hitchcock.

Film stardom
Carroll was the lead in her second film, What Money Can Buy (1928) with Humberston Wright. She followed it with The First Born (1928) with Miles Mander, which really established her in films. Carroll went to France to make Not So Stupid (1928). Back in Britain she starred in The Crooked Billet (1929) and The American Prisoner (1929), both shot in silent and sound versions. In 1930, she starred in Atlantic, then co-starred with Brian Aherne in The W Plan (1930). In France she was in Instinct (1930). On stage, Carroll appeared in The Roof (1929) for Basil Dean, The Constant Nymph, Mr Pickwick (opposite Charles Laughton) and an adaptation of Beau Geste.

The same year, Carroll starred in the controversial Young Woodley (1930), followed by a farce, French Leave (1930). She had a support role in an early adaptation of Escape (1930) and was the female lead in The School for Scandal (1930) and Kissing Cup's Race (1930). Carroll starred as a French aristocrat in Madame Guillotine (1931) with Aherne, then did another with Mander, Fascination (1931). She was in The Written Law (1931), then signed a contract with Gaumont British for whom she made Sleeping Car (1932) with Ivor Novello.

She had a big hit with I Was a Spy (1933), which won her an award as best actress of the year. It was directed by Victor Saville. Carroll played the title role in the play Little Catherine. Abruptly, she announced plans to retire from films to devote herself to a private life with her husband, the first of four. Carroll went to Hollywood to appear in The World Moves On (1934) for Fox; John Ford directed and Franchot Tone co starred. Back in England she was in The Dictator (1935) for Saville, playing Caroline Matilda of Great Britain.

Hitchcock
Carroll attracted the attention of Alfred Hitchcock and in 1935 starred as one of the director's earliest prototypical cool, glib, intelligent blondes in The 39 Steps. Based on the espionage novel by John Buchan, the film became a sensation and with it so did Carroll. Cited by The New York Times for a performance that was "charming and skillful", Carroll became very much in demand. Of Hitchcock heroines as exemplified by Carroll, film critic Roger Ebert wrote: The female characters in his films reflected the same qualities over and over again: They were blonde. They were icy and remote. They were imprisoned in costumes that subtly combined fashion with fetishism. They mesmerised the men, who often had physical or psychological handicaps.  Sooner or later, every Hitchcock woman was humiliated.

The director wanted to re-team Carroll with her 39 Steps co-star Robert Donat the following year in Secret Agent, a spy thriller based on a work by W. Somerset Maugham. However, Donat's recurring health problems intervened, resulting in a Carroll–John Gielgud pairing. In between the films she made a short drama The Story of Papworth (1935).

Hollywood

Poised for international stardom, Carroll was the first British beauty to be offered a major American film contract.  She accepted a lucrative deal with Paramount Pictures and was cast opposite George Brent in The Case Against Mrs. Ames (1936). She followed this with The General Died at Dawn (1936), and was borrowed by 20th Century Fox to play the female lead in Lloyd's of London (1936) which made a star of Tyrone Power. She stayed at the studio to make On the Avenue (1937), a musical with Dick Powell and Alice Faye.

Carroll went to Columbia for It's All Yours (1937) then was cast by David O. Selznick as Ronald Colman's love interest in the 1937 box-office success The Prisoner of Zenda. Walter Wanger put her in Blockade (1938) with Henry Fonda, about the Spanish Civil War. Back at Paramount she made some comedies with Fred MacMurray, Cafe Society (1939) and Honeymoon in Bali (1939). Edward Small gave her top billing in My Son, My Son! (1940) with Aherne.

She starred in Safari (1940) then played against Gary Cooper in North West Mounted Police (1940), directed by Cecil B. DeMille. Paramount put Carroll opposite MacMurray in Virginia (1941) and One Night in Lisbon (1941). Virginia also starred Sterling Hayden who was reteamed with Carroll in Bahama Passage (1941). Carroll was Bob Hope's love interest in My Favorite Blonde (1942).

Radio and theatre
On radio, Carroll was a participant in The Circle (1939) on NBC, discussing "current events, literature and drama" each week. In 1944, she was the host of This Is the Story, an anthology series dramatising famous novels on the Mutual Broadcasting System. At the tail end of radio's golden age, Carroll starred in the NBC soap opera The Affairs of Dr. Gentry (1957–59). She also was one of a group of four stars who rotated in taking the lead in each week's episode of The NBC Radio Theater (1959).

In 1948 she made her debut on Broadway as Agatha Reed in Fay Kanin's Goodbye, My Fancy; a role later portrayed by Joan Crawford in the 1951 film adaptation.

Return to Britain
Carroll returned to Britain after the war. She was in White Cradle Inn (1947). She went back to the US and was reunited with MacMurray for An Innocent Affair (1948). Her last film was The Fan (1949).

Awards
In 1946, Carroll was awarded France's Legion of Honour for her overseas work, during World War II, liaising between the forces of the United States Army and the French Resistance, and her post-war fostering of amity between France and the United States.

For her contributions to the film industry, Carroll was inducted into the Hollywood Walk of Fame in 1960 with a motion pictures star located at 6707 Hollywood Boulevard.

A commemorative monument and plaques were unveiled in her birthplace, West Bromwich, to mark the centenary of her birth. Her story is one of rare courage and dedication when at the height of her success she gave up her acting career during World War II to work in the line of fire on troop trains for the Red Cross in Italy after her sister was killed by a German air raid – for which she was awarded the American Medal of Freedom.

Personal life

Carroll married her first husband, Colonel Philip Reginald Astley, in 1931; they divorced in 1939. He was an estate agent, big-game hunter and soldier. In 1941, she starred opposite Sterling Hayden in Virginia. The following year they married, divorcing in 1946. After her only sister, Marguerite, was killed in World War II's London Blitz, Carroll made a radical shift from acting to working in field hospitals as a Red Cross nurse. Having become a naturalised US citizen in 1943, she served at the American Army Air Force's 61st Station Hospital in Foggia, Italy, in 1944, where wounded airmen flying out of area's air bases were hospitalised.  She earned the rank of captain and received the Medal of Freedom for her nursing service.

Carroll first visited Spain's Costa Brava in 1934. The following year she bought an estate in Calonge, where her seaside home, Castell Madeleine, was constructed. She was prevented from living there by the Spanish Civil War and World War II and moved to Marbella in 1949. The home was later demolished, leaving one tower intact, and a housing development named after it (Urbanización Castell Madeleine). During the war, Carroll donated another property of hers, a château she owned outside Paris, to house more than one hundred and fifty orphans, arranging for groups of young people in California to knit clothing for them. In an RKO-Pathe News bulletin she was filmed at the château with children and staff wearing the donated clothes thanking those who contributed. She was awarded the Légion d'Honneur for her efforts by France. Allied Commander Dwight Eisenhower remarked in private that, of all the movie stars he met in Europe during the war, he was most impressed with Carroll and Herbert Marshall (who worked with military amputees).

After the war, Carroll stayed in Europe where she conducted a radio program fostering French-American friendship and helped in the rehabilitation of concentration camp victims, during which she met her future third husband, the French producer Henri Lavorel. In late 1946, she went briefly to Switzerland to film a British film, White Cradle Inn (aka High Fury).

On her return to Paris, she and Lavorel formed a production company and made several two-reel documentaries to promote peace, one of which, Children's Republic, was shown at the Cannes Film Festival. Carroll told the Christian Science Monitor that "wars are started at the top but can be prevented at the bottom, if all men and women will rid themselves of distrust and suspicion of that which is foreign." Filmed in a small orphanage in the town of Sèvres, just southwest of Paris, it focused attention on the devastation of children's lives in Europe caused by war. Widely shown in Canada, it became a prime source of funds for the manufacture of artificial limbs for wounded children.

In 1947, Carroll returned to the US together with Lavorel. Their intention was for her to resume her acting career, which would fund their production company, but they soon separated. Appearing in three more films until 1949 and debuting on Broadway in 1948, Carroll then mostly retired from acting, although she did occasionally appear on television and radio until the mid-1960s.

She married Andrew Heiskell, publisher of Life, in 1950, and they had a daughter Anne Madeleine in 1951. They divorced in 1965. By then, Carroll had moved to Paris. She later moved to Spain, where she shared an estate with her mother and her daughter. Her mother died in 1975 and her daughter, having relocated to New York, died in 1983.

Death
Carroll died on 2 October 1987, aged 81, in Marbella, Spain, from pancreatic cancer and is buried in the cemetery of Sant Antoni de Calonge in Catalonia.

Filmography

 The Guns of Loos (1928) as Diana Cheswick
 What Money Can Buy (1928) as Rhoda Pearson
 The First Born (1928) as Lady Madeleine Boycott
 Not So Stupid (1928)
 The Crooked Billet (1929) as Joan Easton
 The American Prisoner (1929) as Grace Malherb
 Atlantic (1929) as Monica
 The W Plan (1930) as Rosa Hartmann
 Instinct (1930) 
 Young Woodley (1930) as Laura Simmons
 French Leave (1930) as Mlle. Juliette / Dorothy Glenister
 Escape (1930) as Dora
 The School for Scandal (1930) as Lady Teazle
 Kissing Cup's Race (1930) as Lady Molly Adair
 Madame Guillotine (1931) as Lucille de Choisigne
 Fascination (1931) as Gwenda Farrell
 The Written Law (1931) as Lady Margaret Rochester
 Sleeping Car (1933) as Anne
 I Was a Spy (1933) as Martha Cnockhaert
 The World Moves On (1934) as Mrs. Warburton, 1825 / Mary Warburton Girard, 1914
 The Dictator (1935) as Queen Caroline Mathilde of Denmark
 The 39 Steps (1935) as Pamela
 The Story of Papworth, the Village of Hope (1935, short) as The Introducer
 Secret Agent (1936) as Elsa Carrington
 The Case Against Mrs. Ames (1936) as Hope Ames
 The General Died at Dawn (1936) as Judy Perrie
 Lloyd's of London (1936) as Lady Elizabeth
 On the Avenue (1937) as Mimi Caraway
 It's All Yours (1937) as Linda Gray
 The Prisoner of Zenda (1937) as Princess Flavia
 Blockade (1938) as Norma
 Cafe Society (1939) as Christopher West
 Honeymoon in Bali (1939) as Gail Allen
 My Son, My Son! (1940) as Livia Vaynol
 Safari (1940) as Linda Stewart
 Northwest Mounted Police (1940) as April Logan
 Virginia (1941) as Charlotte Dunterry
 One Night in Lisbon (1941) as Leonora Perrycoate
 Bahama Passage (1941) as Carol Delbridge
 My Favorite Blonde (1942) as Karen Bentley
 White Cradle Inn (1947) as Magda
 An Innocent Affair (1948) as Paula Doane
 The Fan (1949) as Mrs. Erlynne

Radio appearances

See also

References

External links

 Official website (archived)
 
 
 
 Madeleine Carroll at Virtual History
 
 
 
 
 

1906 births
1987 deaths
20th-century English actresses
20th Century Studios contract players
Alumni of the University of Birmingham
Deaths from cancer in Spain
Deaths from pancreatic cancer
English emigrants to the United States
English expatriates in Spain
English film actresses
English people of French descent
English people of Irish descent
Recipients of the Legion of Honour
Paramount Pictures contract players
People from West Bromwich
Actors from Staffordshire
People educated at West Bromwich Grammar School